Simon Atingban Akunye (born 2 February 1954) is a Ghanaian politician. He was a member of the Fifth Parliament of the Fourth Republic of Ghana, representing the Pusiga  constituency in the Upper east region of Ghana.

Early life and education 
Akunye was born on February 2, 1954. He is a hails from Pusiga in the Upper East Region of Ghana. He is a registered general nurse. He obtained his nursing certificate in Nigeria. This was in 1984. He also holds an Executive master's degree in Governance and Leadership from the Ghana Institute of Management and Public Administration. He acquired the certificate in 2008.

Career   
Akunye is a senior nursing officer at Akunye Memorial Clinic.

Politics  
Akunye was first voted into parliament on the ticket of the National Democratic Congress during the 2004 Ghanaian general elections. He run for a second term in office in 2008 in which he won. However, he lost the National Democratic Congress primaries in 2016.Thereafter, he decided to go Independent during the 2016 Ghanaian parliamentary elections, but lost the Pusiga seat to Laadi Ayii Ayamba of the National Democratic Congress.

Elections  
Akunye was elected as the member of parliament for the Pusiga constituency of the Upper East Region of Ghana in the 2004 Ghanaian general elections. He won on the ticket of the National Democratic Congress. His constituency was a part of the 9 parliamentary seats out of 13 seats won by the  National Democratic Congress in that election for the Upper East Region. The National Democratic Congress won a minority total of 94 parliamentary seats out of 230 seats.  He was elected with 12,112 votes out of 18,700 total valid votes cast. This was equivalent to 64.8% of total valid votes cast. He was elected over Yahaya Seidu Awinaba of the New Patriotic Party. He obtained 6,588 votes of total votes cast. This was equivalent to 35.2% of total valid votes cast.

In 2008, he was elected as the member of parliament for the same constituency. He won on the ticket of the National Democratic Congress. He was elected with 8,803 votes out of 15,684 total valid votes cast. This was equivalent to 56.13% of total valid votes cast. He was elected over Azongo Peter Tasiri of the Peoples’ National Convention, Mohammed Imoro Asoko of the New Patriotic Party and Abugbila Daniel of the Convention People's Party. These obtained 391, 5,021 and 1,469 votes respectively of total votes cast. These were equivalent to 2.49%, 32.01% and 9.37% respectively of total valid votes cast.

Personal life 
He is a Catholic and married with eight children.

See also 
Pusiga (Ghana parliamentary constituency)

References 

Living people
1954 births
Ghanaian Roman Catholics
Ghana Institute of Management and Public Administration alumni
Ghanaian MPs 2005–2009
Ghanaian MPs 2009–2013
National Democratic Congress (Ghana) politicians